Dominik Sokolović (10 June 1776 – 1 October 1837) was a Croatian priest in the Catholic Church who served as a capitular vicar of the Diocese of Trebinje-Mrkan. Sokolović lived in Dubrovnik from 1820 until his death in 1837.  Sokolović was ordained in 1799 and served in the Diocese of Trebinje-Mrkan, part of the Ottoman Empire bordering modern-day Austria.

Early life 
Sokolović was born in Dubrovnik, Croatia on 10 June 1776. His father Marko was a goldsmith, originally from Trebimlja and his mother Marija, a daughter of Dominik Grillo. Sokolović was ordained in 1799 by the bishop of Treebinje-Mrkan, Nikola Ferić After becoming a priest, Sokolović served as Ferić's secretary.

Ascension to diocesan administrator 
In 1814, Austria gained territory of Dalmatia, including Dubrovnik, and tried to exert its influence on the neighboring parts of the Ottoman Empire, using the archbishops of Dubrovnik to do so. The Diocese of Trebinje-Mrkan was located in the Ottoman Empire bordering the Austrian Empire, and its metropolitans were the archbishops of Dubrovnik. Ferić was the last bishop of Trebinje-Mrkan, and with his death in 1819, the chapter of the Archdiocese of Dubrovnik appointed Sokolović as the diocesan administrator.

The Diocese of Trebinje-Mrkan 
After Ferić's  death in 1819, Sokolović served as a secretary to his [Ferić 's] brother Đuro, who was a diocesan administrator of the Archdiocese of Dubrovnik. As a seat of the metropolitan area, the Archdiocese of Dubrovnik had a right to appoint a diocesan administrator for Trebinje-Mrkan. Antun Krša, a poet from Dubrovnik, wrote that the Ferić brothers loved Sokolović "like a son". Though the clergy of Trebinje-Mrkan named one of their own Grgo Matuško as the diocesan administrator, Đuro Ferić appointed Sokolović to the post, a decision supported by the Austrian government. Although parish priests of Trebinje-Mrkan opposed Sokolović's appointment, preferring their general vicar Grgo Matuško for the post, Sokolović officially received jurisdiction from the Holy See on 20 February 1820.  The regional Dalmatian government confirmed this appointment, and Sokolović served as the diocesan administrator for the next eighteen years, until his death in 1837. 

The Ottoman authorities noticed intensified activity of the Austrians and became suspicious of Sokolović's role. During a visitation, Soklović conducted a census of the population in Trebinje-Mrkan. The census recorded 90 Catholic households with 1,011 inhabitants. Ivica Puljić, writing about Sokolović's visitation, cites a document from 5 July 1821, which describes how the Ottoman officials, suspicious of Sokolović's activity, obstructed his visitation and inquired why he made the official visits instead of a bishop.   Sokolović bribed Ottoman officials in order to continue his visitations, and despite their suspicions, continued his work.

In 1828, Pope Leo XII ordered the Archdiocese of Dubrovnik reduced to the status of a diocese, making it equal to Trebeinje-Mrkan and therefore illogical for a vicar of another diocese to control the other.  In order to reflect the equal status of the two dioceses, Sokolović named a local priest Vidoje Maslać his coadjutor in 1835, granting him wide authority within the diocese.

Sokolović also cared for raising the local clergy and in December 1836 sent two candidate priests to the Illyrian College in Loreto.

Upon Sokolović's death in 1837, despite continued insistence by the clergy of Trebinje-Mrkan to elevate one of their own priests, the Austrian diplomacy appointed another diocesan administrator from Dubrovnik, Nikola Đuran as the new bishop.

Death 
Sokolović died in Dubrovnik on 1 October 1837 and is buried in Danče. Although the clergy of Trebinje-Mrkan requested the Propaganda to appoint Maslać as the new bishop, the Dubrovnik chapter chose Nikola Đuran as the new diocesan administrator. Though the appointment of Đuran was not in accordance with the canon law, the Austrian government pressured Pope Gregory XVI to approve the decision of the Dubrovnik chapter and Đuran became Sokolović's successor. The status of Trebinje-Mrkan was further subordinated to Dubrovnik when the pope made the bishops of Dubrovnik permanent apostolic administrators of Trebinje-Mrkan in 1839.

References

Sources 

 
 
 
 
 
 

1776 births
1837 deaths
People from Dubrovnik
18th-century Croatian Roman Catholic priests